Nils Gabrielsson  (April 14, 1876 in Umeå – November 18, 1948) was a Swedish politician. He was a member of the Centre Party.

References
This article was initially translated from the Swedish Wikipedia article.

Centre Party (Sweden) politicians
1876 births
1948 deaths